Simon James Keay, FBA (21 May 1954 – 7 April 2021) was a British archaeologist and academic. Keay specialized in the archaeology of the Roman Empire, particularly Roman Mediterranean ports, commerce and cultural change in Italy and Iberia.

Biography 
Simon Keay was born in London, to a British father, Anthony Keay and an Australian mother, Lorelei (née Shiel) Keay He attended Downside School in Stratton-on-the-Fosse, Somerset.

Keay received his BA (1977) and PhD (1983); funded by a British Academy Scholarship from University College London. Keay joined the University of Southampton in 1985 as lecturer in Iberian Archaeology, eventually becoming  Professor of Roman Archaeology in 1997 where he remained until his retirement in 2020

He was a research professor and director of archaeology at the British School at Rome from 2006.

Simon Keay died on 7 April 2021 after a long illness.

Honours
In 1986, he was elected a Fellow of the Society Antiquaries

In July 2016, Keay was elected a Fellow of the British Academy (FBA), the United Kingdom's national academy for the humanities and social sciences.

Necrology
 Martin Millett "Simon Keay obituary: Archaeologist who specialised in the Roman empire, focusing on ports and commerce in Italy and Spain" The Guardian 9 May 2021

References

Academics of the University of Southampton
Fellows of the British Academy
1954 births
British archaeologists
2021 deaths
Classical archaeologists